Bernard de Wilde (1691 – 1772) was a Southern Netherlandish architect.

He carried out most of his work in Ghent. Together with David t'Kindt, he is the most important representative of Ghent Rococo. His works are marked by a strong French influence.

Some of his works include:

  on the Korenmarkt (Louis XIV style)
  on the Vrijdagmarkt
 College building of the Augustinians, now Academy of Fine Arts
 Hotel Schamp (1721) (presumably after his design)
 Saint Sebastian Theater on the Kouter (1737)

References

1691 births
1772 deaths
Architects of the Austrian Netherlands